The rivalry between América Futebol Clube and Clube Atlético Mineiro is a footballing rivalry played between Brazilian clubs América Mineiro and Atlético Mineiro, from Belo Horizonte. The clubs first played against each other in 1913, and was for many decades considered the biggest encounter in Minas Gerais. With the fallback suffered by América due to initially refusing to become a professional club and the rise of Cruzeiro, it lost its status as the most important derby in the state, but the rivalry between América and Atlético continued.

History 

Atlético Mineiro was founded in 1908 in Belo Horizonte, Minas Gerais; América emerged four years later. The first match between the two clubs happened on 13 November 1913, and finished 1–1. The two clubs, together with Yale, took part in the Taça Bueno Brandão in 1914. It was the first competition organised in the state, and was won by Atlético. In 1915, Atlético also won the inaugural edition of the Campeonato Mineiro, the state league of Minas Gerais. The competition was then organised by the Liga Mineira de Sports Athléticos, which would later become the Federação Mineira de Futebol.

Despite Atlético's initial success, América was the dominant force in the first decades of the encounter. It won the following ten editions of the Campeonato Mineiro, and Atlético only won the state league again in 1926. The matches between the two clubs were known in their early days as the Clássico das Multidões ("Derby of the Masses") as they were the most popular clubs in the state. Atlético Mineiro was founded by liberal, upper-class students, but from an early age it opened its doors to players from every social class, nationality or ethnicity, which earned it a "people's club" status in Belo Horizonte and in the state. América, meanwhile, had a reputation as an elitist club.

In the 1930s, Atlético pioneered professionalization of football in Minas Gerais, whereas América resisted against it. América suffered a setback as a result of its internal disagreements regarding professionalism. A controversial Campeonato Mineiro final happened in 1948, when América won 3–1 with what was known as the "gol do guarda" ("guard goal"). The match was disputed at América's Estádio da Alamaeda, and Atlético could draw to be crowned champion. When América was winning 2–1, forward Murilinho kicked the ball, after which it bounced on a municipal officer and entered the goal. The goal was confirmed by English referee John Barrick, and América was champion of the competition.

With América's setback in the 1930s and Cruzeiro's rise to prominence since the 1940s, the derby lost some importance in the state to the Clássico Mineiro in this decade. The rivalry between Atlético and Cruzeiro eventually became the biggest derby in Minas Gerais in the 1960s, after the construction of the Mineirão.

Records

Biggest wins:
For América: América 7–2 Atlético Mineiro, (15 May 1952 and 6 April 1979);
For Atlético Mineiro: Atlético Mineiro 6–1 América (11 September 1938).
Top goalscorers:
For América: Zuca, 13 goals;
For Atlético Mineiro: Reinaldo, 19 goals.
Biggest unbeaten runs:
For América: 19 games (26 May 1918 to 8 October 1922);
For Atlético Mineiro: 18 games (24 March 1966 to 28 February 1971).
Most consecutive wins:
For América: 8 wins (3 January 1960 to 13 November 1960);
For Atlético Mineiro: 14 wins (26 November 1966 to 28 February 1971).

References

América Futebol Clube (MG)
Clube Atlético Mineiro
Brazilian football derbies